Leah Sarah Betts (1 November 1977 – 16 November 1995) was a young woman from Latchingdon, Essex, United Kingdom, who died shortly after her 18th birthday after taking an ecstasy (MDMA) tablet, and then drinking approximately  of water in a 90 minute period. Four hours later, she collapsed into a coma, from which she did not recover. The inquest determined that the death had resulted from water intoxication and hyponatremia, which in turn led to serious swelling of the brain, though the ecstasy may have inhibited her ability to urinate.

Her death received extensive media coverage, and her family have since campaigned against drug abuse.

Initial press and public reaction
When Leah Betts was first admitted to hospital in a coma, her family released her image to the national media as an example of the dangers of illegal drugs, specifically ecstasy, in an attempt to deter other young people from using drugs. This campaigning continued for years following her death. 

Leah's mother, Dorothy May Betts, had died of a heart attack three years prior, in 1992, at age 45. Following this, Leah lived with her father Paul Betts (a former police officer), her stepmother (a nurse), and her brother William, who was seven years younger. 

The fact that Betts's life was typical of middle-class families in Britain was a likely factor in the widespread coverage of her death. For many years prior, the media had portrayed typical drug users as being from broken homes in inner city areas and the "sink" council estates. It was suggested that the pill she had taken was from a "contaminated batch". Not long afterward, a 1,500-site poster campaign used a photograph of a smiling Leah Betts (not a picture of her on her deathbed, as some sources erroneously claim) with the caption "Sorted: Just one ecstasy tablet took Leah Betts".

Alternative rock band Chumbawamba responded with their own 'anti-poster' reading "Distorted: you are just as likely to die from eating a bay leaf as from an ecstasy tablet".

Death and inquest
Betts died on the morning of 16 November 1995, five days after being admitted to hospital, when her life support machine was switched off. Her funeral took place on 1 December 1995 at Christ Church, Latchingdon. She was buried alongside her mother at St. Mary Magdalen church in Great Burstead, Essex.

A subsequent inquest determined that her death was not directly caused by the consumption of ecstasy, but rather the result of the large quantity of water she had consumed. She had apparently been in observation of an advisory warning commonly given to ravers which stated drinking water would help her avoid dehydration as a result of continuous dancing. This resulted in water intoxication and hyponatremia, which in turn led to serious swelling of the brain, irreparably damaging it. 

However, the ecstasy tablet may have reduced her ability to urinate, exacerbating her hyponatremia; a symptom known as SIADH. At the inquest, it was stated by toxicologist John Henry, who had previously warned the public of the danger of MDMA causing death by dehydration, "If Leah had taken the drug alone, she might well have survived. If she had drunk the amount of water alone, she would have survived."

Police response
Essex Police assigned 35 officers and major resources to identifying the suppliers of the tablet Betts had taken. However, after an investigation that cost £300,000, the only people charged were four of her friends who had been present at the house, two of whom accepted police cautions with the other two prosecuted. Of these, one received a conditional discharge, while the other was acquitted after a retrial.

Subsequent events
After Betts's death, the media focused on the claim that it was the first time she had taken the drug. It was later determined that she had taken the drug at least three times previously. Her father, Paul, subsequently became a vocal public campaigner against drug abuse. He and his wife were present at the press conference at which Barry Legg MP launched his Public Entertainments Licences (Drug Misuse) Bill, which allowed councils to close down licensed venues if the police believed controlled drugs were being used at or near the premises.

It was reported that the £1m Sorted posters campaign was the pro bono work of three advertising companies: Booth Lockett and Makin (media buyers), Knight Leech and Delaney (advertising agency), and FFI (youth marketing consultants). Booth Lockett and Makin counted brewers Löwenbräu as one of its major clients, at a time when the alcohol industry saw increasing MDMA use as a threat to profits. The other two companies represented energy drink Red Bull, a professional relationship that had earned Knight Leech and Delaney £5 million and was described by one of FFI's executives as such: "We do PR for Red Bull, for example, and we do a lot of clubs. It's very popular at the moment because it's a substitute for taking ecstasy."

The December 1995 murder of three alleged drug dealers in Rettendon, an event dubbed the "Range Rover murders", has been suggested by the media as a potential act of revenge for Betts's death.

See also
 Anna Wood, an Australian teenager who died in similar circumstances three weeks prior to Betts' death
 Moral panic
 Overdose
 Rachel Whitear
 Recreational drug use
 Responsible drug use
 War on drugs

References

External links
 Her best friend talks to the Observer 10 years on
 TheDEA.org: Hyponatremia. An account of Leah Betts's death with some discussion of the medical mechanisms of hyponatremia-induced brain death.

1977 births
1995 deaths
Accidental deaths in England
Drug-related deaths in England
Illegal drug trade
People from Maldon District
Crime in Essex